A by-election was held for the New South Wales Legislative Assembly electorate of Argyle on 9 December 1881 because of the death of Phillip Myers on 16 November 1881.

Dates

Results

Phillip Myers died.

See also
Electoral results for the district of Argyle
List of New South Wales state by-elections

References

1881 elections in Australia
New South Wales state by-elections
1880s in New South Wales